Hawthorn School for Girls is a private, independent, all-girls school located in Toronto, Ontario, Canada, and offers a Catholic education. It was established in 1989. Hawthorn is a part of the Conference of Independent Schools of Ontario Athletic Association (CIS), and a member of Canadian Accredited Independent Schools (CAIS).

Hawthorn admits from preschool to grade 12. Students take part in various out of school activities, such as the Ontario Classics Conference and The Canadian Independent Schools Music Festival. Students are encouraged to participate in service projects, school plays, musicals, orientations, and sleep-away camps, as these are all opportunities available to students as part of their basic curriculum.  An additional highlight to Upper School students are trips to such places as Peru and Rome.  The Rome trip, which occurs every three years, allows students to visit Italy for a cultural spring break immersion, to be part of many of the things they have studied and learned about only at an academic level.  The Peru trip began in 2010 over March Break; senior Upper School students travelled to Santa Cruz, in the Canete Valley of Peru to volunteer at Condoray, a cultural centre.  They worked with mothers and their children, planting gardens, teaching hygiene to the children through play, and helping in the village in small ways.  The Peru trip was such a success that it will now occur every 3 years.

Academics

The Hawthorn curriculum is based on the classical liberal arts tradition.

Hawthorn School for Girls currently offers Advanced Placement (AP) courses in Statistics, Calculus AB, Calculus BC, Physics, and American History.

Upper School

The Upper School accommodates students from Grades 8 to 12.  Emphasis is placed on the humanities as well as on mathematics and the sciences. Courses in Latin, philosophy, moral theology and history are mandatory for Catholic and non Catholic students. It has an enriched visual arts programme.

Lower School

In grades 1-7, the curriculum focuses on phonetic, literacy and mathematics skills.

Junior Program

There is also a Co-ed Junior Program, suitable for children ranging from pre-school to Senior Kindergarten.

Educating the whole person is part of Hawthorn’s philosophy of education. Extra-curricular sports provide opportunities for students to develop their physical capacities, as well as providing balance to the rigor of academics and an arena for character development. School teams compete in the Conference of Independent Schools Athletic Association (CISAA) and comply with the CISAA Constitution and Sport Guidelines. Girls in grade 4 and up can join the competitive teams such as, Cross Country, Volleyball, Basketball, Track and Field.

Clubs and activities

Hawthorn participates in CISMF (Conference of Independent Schools Music Festival), and the Classics Conference. Hawthorn has many clubs, mainly for Upper School Students, such as:
Student Council,
Math Club,
French Club,
Spanish Club,
Athletic Council,
Yearbook Club,
The Veritas Student Newspaper, and
Hawthorn Ties School Newsletter.

Hawthorn has concerts and performances such as:
Christmas Concert,
Spring Concert,
CISMF Concert at Roy Thomson Hall,
School Play,
Grandparent's Day, and
French Cafe.

Uniform

The basic uniform for girls in junior kindergarten to grade 5 is a navy blue tunic with the school crest, worn over a crested dress shirt. Students in grade 6 and 7 wear a Mackenzie plaid kilt or gray dress pants with a crested dress shirt and v-neck navy blue sweater (crested) or vest sweater (also crested). A tie is added on Number 1 Dress Days. Students grade 8 and up wear a similar uniform to grade 6 and 7, but a school blazer (navy blue) is also worn, and an optional French-cut blouse. On Number One Dress Days, students either add the tie or the tie and blazer to their uniform. These are days of a school assembly, performance, or a school Mass.

References

External links
 School website

Private schools in Toronto
Educational institutions established in 1989
1989 establishments in Ontario
Catholic secondary schools in Ontario
Catholic elementary schools in Ontario
Girls' schools in Canada